Beryl J. Levine (November 9, 1935 – June 4, 2022) was a justice of the North Dakota Supreme Court from 1985 to 1996. Levine was the first ever female justice of the state's court.

Education 

Levine was born on  November 9, 1935, in Winnipeg, Manitoba, Canada to Bella and Maurice “Chick” Choslovsky. She earned a Bachelor of Arts from the University of Manitoba in 1964 and a Juris Doctor from the University of North Dakota School of Law in 1974.

Career 

After graduating law school, she worked at the Vogel Law Firm from 1974 until her appointment to the bench in 1985. On January 17, 1985, she was appointed to the North Dakota Supreme Court by Governor George A. Sinner, becoming the first woman ever appointed. She served for eleven years, resigning on March 1, 1996. In 1996, she was awarded the Margaret Brent Award and in 2005, she was also awarded the Sioux Award, the highest honor given by the University of North Dakota Alumni Association & Foundation for achievement, service and loyalty.

Personal life 

Levine married Dr. Leonard Levine on June 7, 1955 and he preceded her in death in 2020. She died on June 4, 2022 in San Mateo, California, aged 86.

See also
List of female state supreme court justices

References

External links
Beryl J. Levine biography

1935 births
2022 deaths
20th-century American judges
20th-century American women lawyers
20th-century American lawyers
Justices of the North Dakota Supreme Court
North Dakota lawyers
People from Winnipeg
People from Palo Alto, California
University of Manitoba alumni
University of North Dakota alumni
20th-century American women judges